The Confederación General de Trabajadores  (General Confederation of Workers, CGT) was a federation of labor unions in Mexico. It was founded in February 1921 by anarchists, syndicalists and others on the far left who opposed the more moderate, pro-government Confederación Regional Obrera Mexicana (CROM). In particular, the founders of the CGT criticized the CROM's close relationship with the conservative American Federation of Labor (AFL). Unions split from the CROM, with 43 affiliating with the new CGT, but it was just a tenth the size of the CROM, with strength among textile workers. President Alvaro Obregón (1920-1924) favored the CROM, and his administration attempted to suppress the CGT. When Adolfo de la Huerta made a bid for the presidency in 1923 in an armed rebellion, some in the CGT supported him.

Briefly after its formation, the CGT allied with the Mexican Communist Party (PCM), but disputes ended the relationship almost immediately. In the decades that followed, the CGT became increasingly anti-communist. The CGT remained far smaller than the CROM, and by the 1930s both federations were dwarfed by the Confederation of Mexican Workers (CTM).

See also 
Anarchism in Mexico

References

Further reading
Carr, Barry. El movimiento obrero y la política en México,1910-1929. 2 vols. Mexico City: Secretaría de Educación Pública 1976.

National trade union centers of Mexico
Trade unions in Mexico
Trade unions established in 1921